Hülya Koçyiğit (born 12 December 1947) is a Turkish actress. A prominent female lead in the Turkish cinema, she received numerous awards at international film festivals, including the Antalya Golden Orange Film Festival. Altogether, she has acted in some 180 films.

Biography 
Koçyiğit's father is a Turkish immigrant from Bulgaria. She grew up in Istanbul and finished her secondary education in Ankara, where she attended Atatürk High School for Girls. She joined Istanbul City Theatre during her middle education. She then enrolled in Ankara Academy of State Art's ballet department for education in the arts.

Koçyiğit decided to venture into cinema in 1963 after she was the runner-up in a beauty contest organized by the magazine Ses (literally: Sound). Her debut film was the 1964 Susuz Yaz (Dry Summer), which went on to win the Golden Bear Award at the 14th Berlin International Film Festival. This honor was the first of its kind ever bestowed upon a Turkish movie. Derman, a film she starred in was the first Turkish film that played in five continents. Kurbağalar, another of her famous films was the first Turkish movie that was sold to international televisions. She received the distinction of "Turkish state artist" in 1991.

Lütfü Akad, Atıf Yılmaz, Şerif Gören, Metin Erksan, Orhan Aksoy, Memduh Ün, Ertem Eğilmez, Osman F. Seden, Halit Refiğ are some of the famous directors who have worked with Koçyiğit.

Koçyiğit holds the distinction of being the Turkish actress of having won the most national and international awards and is probably, the most recognised face of the Turkish silver screen. Her movies between 1965 and 1974, her golden period, constantly captivated movie audiences. She was recognizable in many countries like Algeria, Greece, Iran, Lebanon.

In 2009, she starred in the Turkish TV adaptation of the famous American series, The Golden Girls. Koçyiğit played the role originated by Bea Arthur.

She married in 1968 to Selim Soydan, then a Fenerbahçe S.K. footballer. The couple has a daughter named Gülşah.

Filmography

Series
Macide Öğretmen
Asla Unutma
Nisan Yağmuru
Altın Kızlar

Movies

Awards

Domestic festival awards 
 Best Actress of the Year, Turkish Ministry of Tourism (1964)
 Woman of the Year, Turkish Women's Union (1964)
 Golden Orange (Antalya) for Cemile (1969)
 Golden Boll (Adana) for Zehra (1972)
 Golden Orange (Antalya) for Diyet (1975)
 Golden Orange (Antalya) for Derman (1984)
 Golden Orange (Antalya) for Karılar Koğuşu (1990)
 Golden Orange, Lifetime Achievement Award
 Golden Boll, Lifetime Achievement Award
 Çasot, Lifetime Achievement Award
 Istanbul Film Festival, Honorary Award
 Ankara Film Festival, Honorary Award
 Uçan Süpürge Film Festival, Honorary Award
 Siyad, Honorary Award

International film awards 
 Most Successful Actress Award for Kurbağalar, Nantes Film Festival (1987)
 Best Actress Award for Bez Bebek, Amiens Film Festival (1988)

Foreign film festival appearances 
 London Film Festival, for Derman
 Berlin Film Festival, for Susuz Yaz
 Mexico Film Festival, for Susuz Yaz
 Tehran Film Festival, for Gelin
 Tashkent Film Festival, for Almanya Acı Vatan

Film festival screenings 
 Susuz Yaz Berlin Film Festival, Mexico Film Festival
 Gelin Tehran Film Festival
 Derman Karlovy Film Festival, Venice Film Festival, London Film Festival, Nantes Film Festival, Damascus Film Festival (She holds the greatest award), Tashkent Film Festival
 Kurbağalar Nantes Film Festival, Best Actress Award
 Yalan Dunya Antalya Film Festival

References

External links 

  
 
 Biyografi.info – Biography of Hülya Koçyiğit 

1947 births
Actresses from Istanbul
Turkish film actresses
Best Actress Golden Orange Award winners
Best Actress Golden Boll Award winners
Golden Orange Life Achievement Award winners
Living people
State Artists of Turkey
20th-century Turkish actresses
21st-century Turkish actresses
Bulgarian Turks in Turkey